Heracleides of Odessus, in Thrace, was an ancient Greek historian mentioned by Stephanus of Byzantium.

Notes

Ancient Greek historians known only from secondary sources
Ancient Thracian Greeks
Writers from Varna, Bulgaria